The 2020–21 Valparaiso University women's basketball team represents Valparaiso University during the 2020–21 NCAA Division I women's basketball season. The Crusaders, led by third-year head coach Mary Evans, played their home games at the Athletics–Recreation Center as members of the Missouri Valley Conference.

On February 11, 2021, the university announced that it is dropping the team name Crusaders, the school mascot and all logos associated with the term because of the  "negative connotation and violence associated with the Crusader imagery", and because some hate groups also used the term.

References

Valparaiso
Valparaiso Beacons women's basketball seasons
Valparaiso Crusaders women's basketball
Valparaiso Crusaders women's basketball